is a former Japanese football player. He is the current first-team coach J2 League club of Thespakusatsu Gunma.  His brother is Yoshiyuki Kobayashi.

Club statistics

References

External links

1982 births
Living people
Komazawa University alumni
Association football people from Saitama Prefecture
Japanese actors
Japanese footballers
J1 League players
J2 League players
Kashiwa Reysol players
Oita Trinita players
Montedio Yamagata players
Thespakusatsu Gunma players
Association football defenders